Gegeneophis is a genus of amphibians in the family Grandisoniidae.   They are found in southern and northeastern India.

Species 
There are 12 species:

References

 
Amphibians of Asia
Amphibian genera
Endemic fauna of India
Taxa named by Wilhelm Peters